

Events

Pre-1600
1358 – The Republic of Ragusa is founded.
1497 – Cornish rebels Michael An Gof and Thomas Flamank are executed at Tyburn, London, England.
1499 – Americo Vespucci, on Spanish financed trip, sights coast south of Cape Cassipore. 
1556 – The thirteen Stratford Martyrs are burned at the stake near London for their Protestant beliefs.

1601–1900
1743 – In the Battle of Dettingen, George II becomes the last reigning British monarch to participate in a battle.
1760 – Anglo-Cherokee War: Cherokee warriors defeat British forces at the Battle of Echoee near present-day Otto, North Carolina.
1806 – British forces take Buenos Aires during the first of the British invasions of the River Plate.
1844 – Joseph Smith, founder of the Latter Day Saint movement, and his brother Hyrum Smith, are killed by a mob at the Carthage, Illinois jail.
1864 – American Civil War: Confederate forces defeat Union forces during the Battle of Kennesaw Mountain during the Atlanta Campaign.
1895 – The inaugural run of the Baltimore and Ohio Railroad's Royal Blue from Washington, D.C., to New York City, the first U.S. passenger train to use electric locomotives.
1898 – The first solo circumnavigation of the globe is completed by Joshua Slocum from Briar Island, Nova Scotia.

1901–present
1905 – During the Russo-Japanese War, sailors start a mutiny aboard the Russian battleship Potemkin.
1914 – The Illinois Monument is dedicated at Cheatham Hill in what is now the Kennesaw Mountain National Battlefield Park. 
1927 – Prime Minister of Japan Tanaka Giichi convenes an eleven-day conference to discuss Japan's strategy in China. The Tanaka Memorial, a forged plan for world domination, is later claimed to be a secret report leaked from this conference. 
1928 – The Rovaniemi township decree was promulgated, as a result of which Rovaniemi seceded from the old rural municipality as its own market town on January 1, 1929.
1941 – Romanian authorities launch one of the most violent pogroms in Jewish history in the city of Iași, resulting in the murder of at least 13,266 Jews.
  1941   – World War II: German troops capture the city of Białystok during Operation Barbarossa.
1944 – World War II: Mogaung is the first place in Burma to be liberated from the Japanese by British Chindits, supported by the Chinese.
1946 – In the Canadian Citizenship Act, the Parliament of Canada establishes the definition of Canadian citizenship.
1950 – The United States decides to send troops to fight in the Korean War.
1954 – The Obninsk Nuclear Power Plant, the Soviet Union's first nuclear power station, opens in Obninsk, near Moscow.
  1954   – The FIFA World Cup quarterfinal match between Hungary and Brazil, highly anticipated to be exciting, instead turns violent, with three players ejected and further fighting continuing after the game.
1957 – Hurricane Audrey makes landfall near the Texas–Louisiana border, killing over 400 people, mainly in and around Cameron, Louisiana.
1973 – The President of Uruguay Juan María Bordaberry dissolves Parliament and establishes a dictatorship.
1974 – U.S. president Richard Nixon visits the Soviet Union.
1976 – Air France Flight 139 (Tel Aviv-Athens-Paris) is hijacked en route to Paris by the PFLP and redirected to Entebbe, Uganda.
1977 – France grants independence to Djibouti.
1980 – The 'Ustica massacre': Itavia Flight 870 crashes in the sea while en route from Bologna to Palermo, Italy, killing all 81 on board.
1981 – The Central Committee of the Chinese Communist Party issues its "Resolution on Certain Questions in the History of Our Party Since the Founding of the People's Republic of China", laying the blame for the Cultural Revolution on Mao Zedong.
1982 – Space Shuttle Columbia launched from the Kennedy Space Center on the final research and development flight mission, STS-4.
1988 – The Gare de Lyon rail accident in Paris, France, kills 56 people.
  1988   – Villa Tunari massacre: Bolivian anti-narcotics police kill nine to 12 and injure over a hundred protesting coca-growing peasants.
1991 – Two days after it had declared independence, Slovenia is invaded by Yugoslav troops, tanks, and aircraft, starting the Ten-Day War.
1994 – Members of the Aum Shinrikyo cult release sarin gas in Matsumoto, Japan. Seven people are killed, 660 injured.
2007 – Tony Blair resigns as British Prime Minister, a position he had held since 1997. His Chancellor, Gordon Brown succeeds him. 
  2007   – The Brazilian Military Police invades the favelas of Complexo do Alemão in an episode which is remembered as the Complexo do Alemão massacre.
2008 – In a highly scrutinized election, President of Zimbabwe Robert Mugabe is re-elected in a landslide after his opponent Morgan Tsvangirai had withdrawn a week earlier, citing violence against his party's supporters.
2013 – NASA launches the Interface Region Imaging Spectrograph, a space probe to observe the Sun.
2014 – At least fourteen people are killed when a Gas Authority of India Limited pipeline explodes in the East Godavari district of Andhra Pradesh, India.
2015 – Formosa Fun Coast fire: A dust fire occurs at a recreational water park in Taiwan, killing 15 people and injuring 497 others, 199 critically.
2017 – A series of powerful cyberattacks using the Petya malware target websites of Ukrainian organizations and counterparts with Ukrainian connections around the globe.

Births

Pre-1600
 850 – Ibrahim II of Ifriqiya, Aghlabid emir (d. 902)
1350 – Manuel II Palaiologos, Byzantine emperor (d. 1425)
1430 – Henry Holland, 3rd Duke of Exeter, Lancastrian leader (d. 1475)
1462 – Louis XII, king of France (d. 1515)
1464 – Ernst II of Saxony, Archbishop of Magdeburg (1476–1513) (d. 1513)
1497 – Ernest I, Duke of Brunswick-Lüneburg (d. 1546)
1550 – Charles IX, king of France (d. 1574)
1596 – Maximilian, Prince of Dietrichstein (d. 1655)

1601–1900
1696 – William Pepperrell, American merchant and soldier (d. 1759)
1717 – Louis-Guillaume Le Monnier, French botanist and physicist (d. 1799)
1767 – Alexis Bouvard, French astronomer and academic (d. 1843)
1805 – Napoléon Coste, French guitarist and composer (d. 1883)
1806 – Augustus De Morgan, English mathematician and logician (d. 1871)
1812 – Anna Cabot Lowell Quincy Waterston, American writer (d. 1899)
1817 – Louise von François, German author (d. 1893)
1828 – Bryan O'Loghlen, Irish-Australian politician, 13th Premier of Victoria (d. 1905)
1838 – Bankim Chandra Chattopadhyay, Indian journalist, author, and poet (d. 1894)
  1838   – Paul Mauser, German weapon designer, designed the Gewehr 98 (d. 1914)
1846 – Charles Stewart Parnell, Irish politician (d. 1891)
1850 – Jørgen Pedersen Gram, Danish mathematician and academic (d. 1919)
  1850   – Lafcadio Hearn, Greek-Japanese historian and author (d. 1904)
1862 – May Irwin, Canadian-American actress and singer (d. 1938)
1865 – John Monash, Australian engineer and general (d. 1931)
1869 – Kate Carew, American illustrator and journalist (d. 1961)
  1869   – Emma Goldman, Lithuanian-Canadian philosopher and activist (d. 1940)
  1869   – Hans Spemann, German embryologist and academic, Nobel Prize laureate (d. 1941)
1870 – Frank Rattray Lillie, American zoologist and embryologist (d. 1947)
1872 – Heber Doust Curtis, American astronomer (d. 1942)
  1872   – Paul Laurence Dunbar, American author, poet, and playwright (d. 1906)
1880 – Helen Keller, American author, academic, and activist (d. 1968)
1882 – Eduard Spranger, German philosopher and academic (d. 1963)
1884 – Gaston Bachelard, French philosopher and poet (d. 1962)
1885 – Pierre Montet, French historian and academic (d. 1966)
  1885   – Guilhermina Suggia, Portuguese cellist (d. 1950)
1886 – Charlie Macartney, Australian cricketer and soldier (d. 1958)
1888 – Lewis Bernstein Namier, Polish-English historian and academic (d. 1960)
  1888   – Antoinette Perry, American actress and director (d. 1946)
1892 – Paul Colin, French illustrator (d. 1985)
1899 – Juan Trippe, American businessman, founded Pan American World Airways (d. 1981)
1900 – Dixie Brown, British boxer (d. 1957)

1901–present
1901 – Merle Tuve, American geophysicist and academic (d. 1982)
1905 – Armand Mondou, Canadian ice hockey player (d. 1976)
1906 – Vernon Watkins, Welsh-American poet and painter (d. 1967)
1907 – John McIntire, American actor (d. 1991)
1908 – João Guimarães Rosa, Brazilian physician and author (d. 1967)
1911 – Marion M. Magruder, American Marine officer, commander of the VMF(N)-533 squadron (d. 1997)
1912 – E. R. Braithwaite, Guyanese novelist, writer, teacher, and diplomat (d. 2016)
1913 – Elton Britt, American singer-songwriter and guitarist (d. 1972)
  1913   – Philip Guston, American painter and academic (d. 1980)
  1913   – Willie Mosconi, American pool player (d. 1993)
1914 – Robert Aickman, English author and activist, co-founded the Inland Waterways Association (d. 1981)
  1914   – Helena Benitez, Filipina academic and administrator (d. 2016)
  1914   – Giorgio Almirante, Italian journalist and politician (d. 1988)
1915 – Grace Lee Boggs, American philosopher, author, and activist (d. 2015)
  1915   – Aideu Handique, Indian actress (d. 2002)
  1915   – John Alexander Moore, American zoologist and academic (d. 2002)
1916 – Robert Normann, Norwegian guitarist (d. 1998)
1918 – Adolph Kiefer, American swimmer (d. 2017)
1919 – M. Carl Holman, American author, educator, poet, and playwright (d. 1988)
  1919   – Amala Shankar, Indian danseuse (d. 2020)
1920 – Fernando Riera, Chilean football player and manager (d. 2010)
1921 – Muriel Pavlow, English actress (d. 2019)
1922 – George Walker, American composer (d. 2018)
1923 – Jacques Berthier, French organist and composer (d. 1994)
  1923   – Elmo Hope, American pianist and composer (d. 1967)
1924 – Bob Appleyard, English cricketer and businessman (d. 2015)
1925 – Leonard Lerman, American geneticist and biologist (d. 2012)
  1925   – Doc Pomus, American singer-songwriter (d. 1991)
  1925   – Wayne Terwilliger, American second baseman, coach, and manager (d. 2021)
1927 – Bob Keeshan, American actor and producer (d. 2004)
1928 – James Lincoln Collier, American journalist and author
  1928   – Rudy Perpich, American dentist and politician, 34th Governor of Minnesota (d. 1995)
1929 – Dick the Bruiser, American football player and wrestler (d. 1991)
  1929   – Peter Maas, American journalist and author (d. 2001)
1930 – Ross Perot, American businessman and politician (d. 2019)
  1930   – Tommy Kono, Japanese American weightlifter (d. 2016)
1931 – Charles Bronfman, Canadian-American businessman and philanthropist 
  1931   – Martinus J. G. Veltman, Dutch physicist and academic, Nobel Prize laureate (d. 2021)
1932 – Eddie Kasko, American baseball player and manager (d. 2020)
  1932   – Anna Moffo, American operatic soprano (d. 2006)
  1932   – Hugh Wood, English composer (d. 2021)
1936 – Lucille Clifton, American author and poet (d. 2010)
  1936   – Shirley Anne Field, English actress
1937 – Joseph P. Allen, American physicist and astronaut
  1937   – Otto Herrigel, Namibian lawyer and politician (d. 2013)
  1937   – Kirkpatrick Sale, American author and scholar
1938 – Bruce Babbitt, American lawyer and politician, 47th United States Secretary of the Interior
  1938   – David Hope, Baron Hope of Craighead, Scottish lieutenant and judge
  1938   – Konrad Kujau, German illustrator (d. 2000)
1939 – R. D. Burman, Indian singer-songwriter (d. 1994)
  1939   – Neil Hawke, Australian cricketer and footballer (d. 2000)
1940 – Ian Lang, Baron Lang of Monkton, Scottish politician, Secretary of State for Scotland
1941 – Bill Baxley, American lawyer and politician, 24th Lieutenant Governor of Alabama
  1941   – James P. Hogan, English-Irish author (d. 2010)
  1941   – Krzysztof Kieślowski, Polish director and screenwriter (d. 1996)
1942 – Bruce Johnston, American singer-songwriter and producer
  1942   – Frank Mills, Canadian pianist and composer 
  1942   – Danny Schechter, American director, producer, and screenwriter (d. 2015)
1943 – Ravi Batra, Indian-American economist and academic
1944 – Angela King, English environmentalist and author, co-founded Common Ground
  1944   – Patrick Sercu, Belgian cyclist (d. 2019)
1945 – Joey Covington, American drummer, songwriter, and producer (d. 2013)
  1945   – Norma Kamali, American fashion designer
1948 – Camile Baudoin, American guitarist
1949 – Vera Wang, American fashion designer
1951 – Ulf Andersson, Swedish chess player
  1951   – Julia Duffy, American actress
  1951   – Gilson Lavis, English drummer and portrait artist
  1951   – Mary McAleese, Irish academic and politician, 8th President of Ireland 
1952 – Madan Bhandari, Nepalese politician (d. 1993)
1953 – Igor Gräzin, Estonian academic and politician
  1953   – Alice McDermott, American novelist
1954 – Richard Ibbotson, English admiral
1955 – Isabelle Adjani, French actress 
1956 – Heiner Dopp, German field hockey player and politician
1957 – Gabriella Dorio, Italian runner
1958 – Lisa Germano, American singer-songwriter and guitarist 
  1958   – Jeffrey Lee Pierce, American singer-songwriter and guitarist (d. 1996)
1959 – Dan Jurgens, American author and illustrator 
  1959   – Lorrie Morgan, American singer
1960 – Craig Hodges, American basketball player and coach
  1960   – Michael Mayer, American theatre director
  1960   – Robert King, English harpsichordist and conductor
  1960   – Jeremy Swift, English actor
1962 – Michael Ball, English actor and singer
  1962   – Sunanda Pushkar, India-born Canadian businesswoman (d. 2014)
1963 – Wendy Alexander, Scottish politician, Minister for Enterprise and Lifelong Learning
  1963   – Johnny Benson Jr., American race car driver
1964 – Stephan Brenninkmeijer, Dutch director, producer, and screenwriter
  1964   – Chuck Person, American basketball player and coach
1965 – Simon Sebag Montefiore, English journalist, historian, and author
  1965   – S. Manikavasagam, Malaysian politician and social activist
  1965   – Óscar Vega, Spanish boxer
1966 – J. J. Abrams, American director, producer, and screenwriter
  1966   – Jörg Bergen, German footballer and manager
  1966   – Jeff Conine, American baseball player and sportscaster
  1966   – Aigars Kalvītis, Latvian politician, businessman, and former Prime Minister of Latvia 
1967 – Sylvie Fréchette, Canadian swimmer and coach
  1967   – George Hamilton, Northern Irish police officer
  1967   – Vasiliy Kaptyukh, Belarusian discus thrower
  1967   – Phil Kearns, Australian rugby player and sportscaster
1968 – Kelly Ayotte, American lawyer and politician, New Hampshire Attorney General
1969 – Viktor Petrenko, Ukrainian figure skater
1970 – Régine Cavagnoud, French skier (d. 2001)
  1970   – John Eales, Australian rugby player and businessman
  1970   – Jim Edmonds, American baseball player and sportscaster
  1970   – Jo Frost, English nanny, television personality, and author
1971 – Serginho, Brazilian footballer
1972 – Dawud Wharnsby, Canadian singer-songwriter, guitarist, and producer
1973 – Abbath Doom Occulta, Norwegian musician
  1973   – Simon Archer, English badminton player
1974 – Christian Kane, American singer-songwriter and actor
  1974   – Christopher O'Neill, English-American businessman
1975 – Ace Darling, American wrestler
  1975   – Bianca Del Rio, American drag queen and comedian
  1975   – Sarah Evanetz, Canadian swimmer
  1975   – Tobey Maguire, American actor 
  1975   – Daryle Ward, American baseball player
1976 – Johnny Estrada, American baseball player
  1976   – Leigh Nash, American singer-songwriter 
1977 – Arkadiusz Radomski, Polish footballer
1978 – Apparat, German musician
1980 – Hugo Campagnaro, Argentinian footballer
  1980   – Jennifer Goodridge, American keyboard player 
  1980   – Alexander Peya, Austrian tennis player 
  1980   – Kevin Pietersen, South African-English cricketer
  1980   – Craig Terrill, American football player
1981 – Andrew Embley, Australian footballer
1983 – Jim Johnson, American baseball player
  1983   – Dale Steyn, South African cricketer
  1983   – Nikola Rakočević, Serbian actor
1984 – Khloé Kardashian, American model, businesswoman, and radio host
  1984   – D.J. King, Canadian ice hockey player
  1984   – Gökhan Inler, Swiss footballer
1985 – James Hook, Welsh rugby player
  1985   – Svetlana Kuznetsova, Russian tennis player
  1985   – Nico Rosberg, German race car driver
1986 – Sam Claflin, British actor
  1986   – Drake Bell, American singer-songwriter, guitarist, and actor
  1986   – Bryan Fletcher, American skier
  1986   – LaShawn Merritt, American sprinter
1987 – India de Beaufort, English actress 
  1987   – Ed Westwick, English actor 
1988 – Stefani Bismpikou, Greek gymnast
  1988   – Matthew Spiranovic, Australian footballer
  1988   – Kate Ziegler, American swimmer
1989 – Hana Birnerová, Czech tennis player
  1989   – Matthew Lewis, English actor
1992 – Ahn So-hee, South Korean singer and actress
  1992   – Karthika Nair, Indian film actress
1993 – Johanna Talihärm, Estonian biathlete
  1993   – Alberto Campbell-Staines, Australian athlete
1994 – Anita Husarić, Bosnian tennis player
1995 – Monté Morris, American basketball player
2002 – Kelee Ringo, American football player

Deaths

Pre-1600
 992 – Conan I of Rennes, Duke of Brittany 
1162 – Odo II, Duke of Burgundy (b. 1118)
1194 – King Sancho VI of Navarre (b. 1132)
1296 – Floris V, Count of Holland (b. 1254)
1458 – Alfonso V of Aragon (b. 1396)
1497 – Michael An Gof, rebel leader 
  1497   – Thomas Flamank, rebel leader
1574 – Giorgio Vasari, Italian historian, painter, and architect (b. 1511)

1601–1900
1601 – Henry Norris, 1st Baron Norreys (b. 1525)
1603 – Jan Dymitr Solikowski, Polish archbishop (b. 1539)
1627 – John Hayward, English historian, journalist, and politician (b. 1564)
1636 – Date Masamune, Japanese strongman (b. 1567)
1654 – Johannes Valentinus Andreae, German theologian (b. 1586)
1655 – Eleonora Gonzaga, Holy Roman Empress (b. 1598)
1672 – Roger Twysden, English historian and politician (b. 1597)
1720 – Guillaume Amfrye de Chaulieu, French poet and author (b. 1639)
1729 – Élisabeth Jacquet de La Guerre, French harpsichord player and composer (b. 1665)
1794 – Wenzel Anton, Prince of Kaunitz-Rietberg (b. 1711)
  1794   – Philippe de Noailles, French general (b. 1715)
1827 – Johann Gottfried Eichhorn, German theologian and academic (b. 1754)
1829 – James Smithson, English chemist and mineralogist (b. 1765)
1831 – Sophie Germain, French mathematician and physicist (b. 1776)
  1831   – Konstantin Pavlovich, grand duke of Russia and the son of Emperor Paul I of Russia (b. 1779)
1839 – Ranjit Singh, founder of the Sikh Empire (b. 1780)
1844 – Hyrum Smith, American religious leader (b. 1800)
  1844   – Joseph Smith, American religious leader, founded the Latter Day Saint movement (b. 1805)
1878 – Sidney Breese, American jurist and politician (b. 1800)
1894 – Giorgio Costantino Schinas, Maltese architect and civil engineer (b. 1834)
1896 – John Berryman, English soldier, Victoria Cross recipient (b. 1825)

1901–present
1905 – Harold Mahony, Scottish-Irish tennis player (b. 1867)
1907 – Elizabeth Cabot Agassiz, American educator, co-founded Radcliffe College (b. 1822)
1911 – Victor Surridge, English motorcycle racer (b. 1882)
1912 – George Bonnor, Australian cricketer (b. 1855)
1917 – Karl Allmenröder, German soldier and pilot (b. 1896)
1919 – Peter Sturholdt, American boxer (b. 1885)
1920 – Adolphe-Basile Routhier, Canadian lawyer and judge (b. 1839)
1934 – Francesco Buhagiar, Maltese politician, 2nd Prime Minister of Malta (b. 1876)
1935 – Eugene Augustin Lauste, French-American inventor (b. 1857)
1944 – Milan Hodža, Czech journalist and politician, 10th Prime Minister of Czechoslovakia (b. 1878)
1946 – Wanda Gág, American author and illustrator (b. 1893)
1948 – Dorothea Bleek, South African anthropologist and philologist (b. 1873)
1949 – Frank Smythe, English botanist and mountaineer (b. 1900)
1950 – Milada Horáková, Czech politician, victim of judicial murder (b. 1901)
1952 – Max Dehn, German-American mathematician and academic (b. 1878)
1957 – Hermann Buhl, Austrian soldier and mountaineer (b. 1924)
1960 – Lottie Dod, English tennis player, golfer, and archer (b. 1871)
1962 – Paul Viiding, Estonian author, poet, and critic (b. 1904)
1967 – Jaan Lattik, Estonian pastor and politician, 9th Minister of Foreign Affairs of Estonia (b. 1878)
1970 – Daniel Kinsey, American hurdler and scholar (b. 1902)
1975 – G.I. Taylor, English mathematician and physicist (b. 1886)
1977 – Arthur Perdue, American businessman (b. 1885)
1986 – George Nēpia, New Zealand rugby player and referee (b. 1905)
1987 – Billy Snedden, Australian lawyer and politician, 17th Attorney-General for Australia (b. 1926)
1989 – A. J. Ayer, English philosopher and academic (b. 1910)
1991 – Milton Subotsky, American-English screenwriter and producer (b. 1921)
1996 – Albert R. Broccoli, American film producer (b. 1909)
1998 – Gilles Rocheleau, Canadian businessman and politician (b. 1935)
1999 – Georgios Papadopoulos, Greek colonel and politician, 169th Prime Minister of Greece (b. 1919)
2000 – Pierre Pflimlin, French lawyer and politician, Prime Minister of France (b. 1907)
2001 – Tove Jansson, Finnish author, illustrator, and painter (b. 1914)
  2001   – Jack Lemmon, American actor (b. 1925)
  2001   – Joan Sims, English actress (b. 1930)
2002 – John Entwistle, English singer-songwriter, bass guitarist, and producer (b. 1944)
  2002   – Robert L. J. Long, American admiral (b. 1920)
2003 – David Newman, American director, producer, and screenwriter (b. 1937)
2004 – George Patton IV, American general (b. 1923)
  2004   – Darrell Russell, American race car driver (b. 1968)
2005 – Shelby Foote, American historian and author (b. 1916)
  2005   – Ray Holmes, English lieutenant and pilot (b. 1914)
  2005   – John T. Walton, American businessman, co-founded the Children's Scholarship Fund (b. 1946)
2006 – Eileen Barton, American singer (b. 1924)
  2006   – Ángel Maturino Reséndiz, Mexican serial killer (b. 1960)
2007 – William Hutt, Canadian actor (b. 1920)
2008 – Sam Manekshaw, Indian field marshal (b. 1914)
2009 – Gale Storm, American actress (b. 1922)
2010 – Corey Allen, American film and television actor, writer, director, and producer (b. 1934)
2011 – Mike Doyle, English footballer (b. 1946)
2012 – Stan Cox, English runner (b. 1918)
  2012   – Rosemary Dobson, Australian poet and illustrator (b. 1920)
2013 – Stefano Borgonovo, Italian footballer (b. 1964)
  2013   – Ian Scott, English-New Zealand painter (b. 1945)
2014 – Edmond Blanchard, Canadian jurist and politician (b. 1954)
  2014   – Allen Grossman, American poet, critic, and academic (b. 1932)
  2014   – Leslie Manigat, Haitian educator and politician, 43rd President of Haiti (b. 1930)
  2014   – Violet Milstead, Canadian World War II aviator and bush pilot (b. 1919)
  2014   – Rachid Solh, Lebanese politician, 48th Prime Minister of Lebanon (b. 1926)
2015 – Zvi Elpeleg, Polish-Israeli diplomat, author, and academic (b. 1926)
  2015   – Knut Helle, Norwegian historian and professor (b. 1930)
  2015   – Chris Squire, English musician (bass guitarist), singer and songwriter, member of the rock band Yes (b. 1948)
2016 – Bud Spencer, Italian swimmer, actor, and screenwriter (b. 1929)
2017 – Peter L. Berger, Austrian sociologist (b. 1929)
2018 – Joe Jackson, American manager, father of Michael Jackson and Janet Jackson (b. 1928)
  2018   – Liz Jackson, Australian journalist and former barrister (b. 1951)
  2018   – William McBride, Australian obstetrician (b. 1927)

Holidays and observances
Christian feast day:
Arialdo
Crescens, one of the Seventy disciples
Cyril of Alexandria (Coptic Church, Roman Catholic Church, Anglican Communion and Lutheran Church)
Ladislaus I of Hungary
Our Lady of Perpetual Help
Sampson the Hospitable
Zoilus
June 27 (Eastern Orthodox liturgics)
Canadian Multiculturalism Day (Canada)
Commemoration Day for the Victims of the Communist Regime (Czech Republic)
 Day of Turkmen Workers of Culture and Art and poetry of Magtymguly Pyragy (Turkmenistan)
Helen Keller Day (United States)
Independence Day, celebrates the independence of Djibouti from France in 1977.
Mixed Race Day (Brazil)
National HIV Testing Day (United States)
National PTSD Awareness Day (United States) 
Seven Sleepers' Day or Siebenschläfertag (Germany)
Unity Day (Tajikistan)

References

External links

 
 
 

Days of the year
June